Several vessels have been named Sultana for the female royal title Sultana.

 Sultana, the flagship of Ali Pasha during the 1571 Battle of Lepanto
  was launched in 1787 or 1788, at Yarmouth. She traded with the Mediterranean and the West Indies. A French privateer captured her in April 1799. She quickly returned to British ownership, but was recaptured again in 1801 returning to Britain from Halifax, Nova Scotia.
 , of 312 tons (bm, armed with 14 cannon, was built in the Bombay Dockyard in 1833 for the Sultan of Oman. He sent her to the United States on what turned out to be a three-month friendship visit to New York. She left Oman on 23 December 1839, touched at Zanzibar and Saint Helena, and arrived at New York on 30 April 1840. She left New York on 7 August and arrived at Zanzibar on 8 December. In 1842 she visited London bearing gifts from Sultan Saeed bin Sultan to Queen Victoria on the occasion of her coronation. 
 , of 775 tons, was built at Sunderland. She made one voyage transporting convicts to Western Australia. Sultana , Henry Richardson , master, sailed from Plymouth, England on 29 May 1859 bound for the Swan River Colony. She arrived at Fremantle on 19 August 1859. She had embarked 224 male convicts, all of whom survived the voyage. She also carried 142 migrants and other passengers.
 Sultana (steamboat), was destroyed in 1865 in the worst maritime disaster in US history.

See also
  – one of three, and possibly five, vessels of the Royal Navy 
 , a small Royal Navy schooner
 , a small Royal Navy cutter
 , a yacht acquired by the U.S. Navy in World War I

Citations

References
 
 
 

Ship names